Petha Manam Pithu is a 1973 Indian Tamil-language drama film directed by S. P. Muthuraman and written by C. Guhanathan. A remake of the Marathi film Manini (1961), it stars Savitri and R. Muthuraman. The film was released on 14 January 1973 and became a success.

Plot

Cast 
 Savitri as Meenakshi
 R. Muthuraman as Ramu
 Major Sundarrajan
 B. Jaya as Seetha
 Jayasudha
 Srikanth
 Cho
 V. Gopalakrishnan
 A. Sakunthala
 Suruli Rajan
 Manorama
 Ganthimathi

Production 
Petha Manam Pithu, a remake of the Marathi film Manini (1961), is S. P. Muthuraman's second film as director. It is Telugu actress Jayasudha's first Tamil film. C. Guhanathan, who wrote Muthuraman's directorial debut Kanimuthu Paappa (1972), was retained as screenwriter for this project too.

Soundtrack 
The music was composed by V. Kumar.

Release and reception 
Petha Manam Pithu was released on 14 January 1973. Kanthan of Kalki lauded the performances of Muthuraman and Jaya, but criticised the story for not offering anything new. The film was a success, and Muthuraman's first to run for over 100 days in theatres.

References

External links 
 

1970s Tamil-language films
1973 drama films
Films directed by S. P. Muthuraman
Films scored by V. Kumar
Films with screenplays by V. C. Guhanathan
Indian drama films
Tamil remakes of Marathi films